KRWA may refer to:

Kampuchean Revolutionary Women's Association of the PRK/SOC (1978–1993)
KRWA radio station broadcasting from Rye, Colorado 
Kansas Rural Water Association
Kentucky Rural Water Association
Kings River Water Association
Kavalloor Residents Welfare Association (India)